Anatole Lewitsky (22 August 1903 – 23 February 1942) was a French anthropologist and member of the French Resistance in World War II.  He was head of the European-Asiatic department at the Musée de l'Homme, and a world authority on Siberian shamanism.

He founded, with Boris Vildé and Yvonne Oddon the resistance group Groupe du musée de l'Homme.  He was betrayed, tried and sentenced to death.  He was killed by firing squad, together with Léon-Maurice Nordmann, Georges Ithier, Jules Andrieu, René Sénéchal, Pierre Walter and Boris Vildé, on 23 February 1942 at Fort Mont-Valérien. They are buried in the cemetery at Ivry-sur-Seine.

References 

Humbert, Agnès (tr. Barbara Mellor), Résistance: Memoirs of Occupied France, London, Bloomsbury Publishing PLC, 2008  (American title: Resistance: A Frenchwoman's Journal of the War, Bloomsbury, USA, 2008)

French anthropologists
French Resistance members
1903 births
1942 deaths
French people executed by Nazi Germany
20th-century anthropologists
Burials at Ivry Cemetery